The Penrith District Junior Rugby League (PDJRL) is an amateur rugby league competition for senior and junior rugby league clubs in the Penrith, Blacktown, and Blue Mountains area.

History 
The competition was founded in 1912 and grew gradually as more clubs from the surrounding areas entered the competition. The first Penrith club were the Waratahs and adopted the blue and white colours, playing out of Penrith Showground. When the Parramatta District Rugby League was formed all the teams from the Penrith and surrounding areas affiliated and played in the Parramatta League. During the early-1960s the NSWRL Second Division was formed where a team from Penrith began playing, in 1967 the now Penrith Panthers were promoted to the NSWRL First Grade competition in that year the following clubs were invited to enter the Penrith District Junior Rugby League; Blacktown, Blacktown Workers, Blacktown St Patricks, Emu Plains, Londonderry Mount Druitt, Penrith Waratahs, Riverstone, Rooty Hill, Richmond, Springwood, Windsor, Warragamba, Warrimoo and St Marys.

The number of clubs in the 1970s grew gradually and more than doubled to 32 clubs. During the late-1980s it was decided to reduce number of clubs to 22. Some teams were either merged or became standalone clubs;
Blacktown Leagues and Blacktown RSL became Blacktown City.
Springwood and Warrimoo became Lower Mountains.
Colo, Richmond and North Richmond became Hawkesbury City.
Colyton and St. Clair became separate clubs.
Blackett and Hebersham became Mt Druitt City.
Tregear and Whalan became Wests Mt Druitt.

Current Open Age Clubs 
2022 Senior Clubs

District clubs

Former clubs

List of A Grade Premiers

--

See also

 Balmain District Junior Rugby League
 Cronulla-Sutherland District Rugby Football League
 Manly-Warringah/North Sydney District Rugby League
 Parramatta Junior Rugby League
 South Sydney District Junior Rugby Football League
 Sydney Roosters Juniors
 Rugby League Competitions in Australia

References

External links
Penrith District Rugby League

Rugby league competitions in New South Wales
Rugby league in Sydney
Amateur rugby league
1912 establishments in Australia
Sports leagues established in 1912
Penrith Panthers